The 1923 Virginia Cavaliers football team represented the University of Virginia as a member of the Southern Conference (SoCon) during the 1923 college football season. Led by first-year head coach  Greasy Neale, the Cavaliers compiled an overall record of 3–5–1 with a mark of 0–3–1 in conference play, placing 17th in the SoCon.

Schedule

References

Virginia
Virginia Cavaliers football seasons
Virginia Cavaliers football